Michael J. McGlynn served as the 31st Mayor of Medford, Massachusetts, from 1988–2016. He also served from 1977–1988 as a member of the Massachusetts House of Representatives representing the 37th Middlesex District (Medford/Malden).

Education
McGlynn graduated from Arlington Catholic High School in 1971. He then attended University of Massachusetts Boston, where he graduated in 1976 with a bachelor's degree in political science/ History.

Family life
McGlynn is married to Sheila (Halmkin) McGlynn and they have 3 daughters, Kathleen, Jennifer, and Amanda. He is the son of former Medford Mayor & City Councilor John J. McGlynn.

Mayoralty
McGlynn made a number of successful contributions as Mayor for the city of Medford in his 28 years in office.
He championed the successful initiative to rebuild all public elementary and middle schools in Medford, because the previous schools were all 80 years or older. It cost the state $110,000,000, and was completed in 2003.
Under a new capital improvement plan he rebuilt all fire stations, city's parks and neighborhoods and infrastructure.
He serves as a member of the Advisory Commission on Local Government appointed by Governor Paul Cellucci and Jane Swift.
McGlynn Has previously served as President of the Massachusetts Mayors Association and Massachusetts Municipal Association. He is a member of Metropolitan Mayors Commission and United States Conference of Mayors.
He is a Chairperson of The Mystic Valley Development Commission which is working on a project called Rivers Edge. Rivers Edge is a Program focusing on mixed-use development of residential, office and open space areas.
 The city of Medford has been selected a "Tree City USA" since 1999 under his leadership.
 In 2004, McGlynn Co-chaired a Caroling Festival called "Medford's Jingle Bell Committee's Caroling Festival" which led to Medford being placed in the Guinness Book Of World Records for the largest group of carol singers.
 In 2013 he was elected to his 13th term and is the longest active serving mayor in Massachusetts, making him the "Dean of Mass Mayors".
 He had been the only mayor elected since Medford changed to a Plan A form of government.
 He is currently the chairman of the National League of Cities Advisory Council.

References

External links
 City of Medford Massachusetts

1953 births
Living people
Democratic Party members of the Massachusetts House of Representatives
University of Massachusetts Boston alumni
Mayors of Medford, Massachusetts
Saint Anselm College alumni